Bill Morton may refer to:

 Bill Morton (SQA), former chief executive of the Scottish Qualifications Authority
 Bill Morton (racing driver), former NASCAR Cup Series driver in 1965 Virginia 500
 Bill Morton (American football) (1909–1987), American football player

See also
 Billy Porter (criminal) aka Billy Morton, American burglar and underworld figure
 William Morton (disambiguation)